The American University in Vietnam (AUV) is a private, newly established higher-educational institution based in Da Nang city, Vietnam, offering American quality college education.

History
The American University in Vietnam (AUV) is a four-year degree granting university providing liberal arts education for direct placement in graduate programs (MA, MS, MBA, PhD) in American universities.

AUV experience transnational university life in Vietnam and in the U.S. Students can complete their studies in their preferred field through 2+2 programs for undergraduate degrees and 2+3, 2+4, 4+1 or 4+2 for master's degrees at select partner universities in the U.S. Course credits are generally transferable to U.S. universities through our institutional partnerships or through individual submissions to admission offices.

Academics
AUV offers both college preparatory courses and undergraduate degrees in business administration, multidisciplinary engineering, communication & media, global studies, etc.

AUV's curriculum is entirely based on the American model of higher education. Before choosing to major in a specialized area of interest, students must complete a rigorous general studies program. They must demonstrate proficiency in communication and basic academic skills before strengthening their critical thinking and analytical abilities through a comprehensive study of social sciences, arts and humanities, mathematics and natural sciences, technology and global communication.

Partnerships

AUV University is partnered with the following universities for academic guidance and credit transfer programs: 
 Arizona State University
 Wentworth Institute of Technology
 Central Michigan University
 University of California, Berkeley
 University of California, Los Angeles
 University of Missouri-Kansas City
 Virginia Commonwealth University,...

References

External links
 Official AUV website

Universities in Da Nang
Educational institutions established in 2011
2011 establishments in Vietnam